Forest germander is a common name for several plants and may refer to:

Teucrium corymbosum, native to Australia and New Guinea
Teucrium racemosum, endemic to Australia